Haiti competed at the 1992 Summer Olympics in Barcelona, Spain.

Competitors
The following is the list of number of competitors in the Games.

Results by event

Athletics 
Men's 100 metres
 Claude Roumain 
 Round 1 — 11.07 seconds (→ did not advance)

Men's 200 metres
 Claude Roumain 
 Round 1 — 22.51 seconds (→ did not advance)

Men's Marathon
 Dieudonné Lamothe — 2:36:11 (→ 76th place)

Judo
Men's Half-Lightweight (– 65 kg)
 Caleb Jean
 Round 1 — Defeated Joseph Momanyi of Kenya
 Round 2 — Lost to Dambiinyam Maralgerel of Mongolia (→ did not advance)

Men's Lightweight (– 71 kg)
 Rubens Joseph
 Round 1 — Bye
 Round 2 — Lost to Massimo Sulli of Italy (→ did not advance)

Men's Half-Middleweight (– 78 kg)
 Jean Alix Holmand
 Round 1 — Bye
 Round 2 — Lost to Byung-Joo Kim of South Korea (→ did not advance)

Men's Middleweight (– 86 kg)
 Hermate Souffrant
 Round 1 — Bye
 Round 2 — Lost to Densign Emmanuel White of the United Kingdom (→ did not advance)

Men's Half-Heavyweight (– 95 kg)
 Parnel Legros
 Round 1 — Bye
 Round 2 — Lost to Radu Ivan of Romania (→ did not advance)

See also
Haiti at the 1991 Pan American Games

References

Nations at the 1992 Summer Olympics
1992
Summer Olympics